Spartina is a 1989 novel by American novelist John Casey. The novel won the National Book Award for 1989.

References 

1989 American novels
National Book Award for Fiction winning works
Novels set in Rhode Island